Derrick Branche (born 1947) is a British actor, best known for his role in the film My Beautiful Laundrette and television roles in The Jewel in the Crown and Father Ted.

Early life and education
Branche was born in 1947 in Bombay (now Mumbai), India, and educated at St. Peter's School, a boarding school for boys in Panchgani near Bombay. Freddie Mercury was his classmate in the school, with whom he formed The Hectics, Mercury's first band, from 1959 to 1962.

Filmography

References

British male film actors
1947 births
Living people
British male television actors
Date of birth missing (living people)
People from Mumbai
Indian emigrants to the United Kingdom